Olkhovatka is an urban-type settlement in the Horlivka Raion, Donetsk Oblast (province) of eastern Ukraine. Population:

Demographics
Native language as of the Ukrainian Census of 2001:
 Ukrainian 13.46%
 Russian 86.08%
 Belarusian 0.28%
 Bulgarian and Hungarian) 0.03%

References

Urban-type settlements in Horlivka Raion